The World of Darkness: Storytelling System Rulebook is a 2004 role-playing game supplement published by White Wolf Publishing for the World of Darkness.

Contents
The World of Darkness: Storytelling System Rulebook is the core rulebook for the World of Darkness and is required to run a game of Vampire: The Requiem, Werewolf: The Forsaken, Promethean: The Created, or Mage: The Awakening.

Publication history
Shannon Appelcine stated that as the World of Darkness setting was published as a new rule system called the Storytelling System, that "This new setting and rule system were combined in a single game book, The World of Darkness (2004), developed by Bill Bridges and Ken Cliffe. This showed off another difference in the new game: it was centered on a single rulebook for all the old games — conquering the problems that the Classic World of Darkness had with its 5+ different rule systems. White Wolf showed how the new line would work by simultaneously releasing Vampire: The Requiem (2004), a sourcebook that supplemented The World of Darkness by offering up all the rules needed to play a Vampire in the setting. A new Vampire product line soon followed, edited by former Atlas Games employee Will Hindmarch."

Reception
The World of Darkness: Storytelling System Rulebook won a 2004 Gamers' Choice Award at the Origins Awards.

The World of Darkness won the 2005 Silver ENnie Awards for Best Writing and Best Game.

Reviews
Pyramid

References

Chronicles of Darkness
Dark fantasy role-playing games
ENnies winners
Origins Award winners
Role-playing game books
Role-playing game supplements introduced in 2004